Sihaki Kuteh (also Romanized as Sīhakī Kūteh) is a village in Taftan-e Jonubi Rural District, Nukabad District, Khash County, Sistan and Baluchestan Province, Iran. As of the 2006 census, its population was 267, in 51 families.

References 

Populated places in Khash County